Lee Eugene (born December 11, 2004), formerly known by the stage name Yoo Jin-woo  is a South Korean actor. He gained recognition for his role Woo Soo-han in JTBC's television series Sky Castle.

Filmography

Film

Television series

Television show

Awards and nominations

References

External links
 

South Korean male television actors
South Korean male film actors
South Korean male child actors
2004 births
Living people
Produce 101 contestants
21st-century South Korean male actors